Sydney Smith (born 1875) was an English footballer who played as a striker for Liverpool in the 1903–04 season. He was born in West Derby, Lancashire.

External links
 LFC History profile

English footballers
Liverpool F.C. players
1875 births
Date of birth missing
Year of death missing
Association football forwards
English Football League players
Footballers from Liverpool